Taşlıçay District is a district of Ağrı Province of Turkey. Its seat is the town Taşlıçay. Its area is 822 km2, and its population is 19,321 (2021).

Composition
There is one municipality in Taşlıçay District:
 Taşlıçay

There are 37 villages in Taşlıçay District:

 Alakoçlu
 Aras
 Aşağıdumanlı
 Aşağıdüzmeydan
 Aşağıesen
 Aşağıtoklu
 Balçiçek
 Bayıraltı
 Bayramyazı
 Boyuncak
 Çöğürlü
 Çökelge
 Dilekyazı
 Düzgören
 Geçitveren
 Gözucu
 Gündoğdu
 Güneysöğüt
 Ikiyamaç
 Kağnılı
 Karagöz
 Kumlubucak
 Kumluca
 Samanyolu
 Tanrıverdi
 Tanyolu
 Taşteker
 Yanalyol
 Yankaya
 Yardımcılar
 Yassıkaya
 Yeltepe
 Yukarıdumanlı
 Yukarıdüzmeydan
 Yukarıesen
 Yukarıtaşlıçay
 Yukarıtoklu

References

Districts of Ağrı Province